The grey-headed lapwing (Vanellus cinereus) is a lapwing species which breeds in northeast China and Japan. The mainland population winters in northern Southeast Asia from northeastern India to Cambodia.  The Japanese population winters, at least partially, in southern Honshū.

This species has occurred as a vagrant in Russia, the Philippines, Indonesia, New South Wales, Australia and Sri Lanka.

Description
The grey-headed lapwing is 34–37 cm long. It has a grey head and neck, darker grey breast band and white belly. The back is brown, the rump is white and the tail is black. This is a striking species in flight, with black primaries, white under wings and upper wing secondaries, and brown upper wing coverts.

Adults of both sexes are similarly plumaged, but males are slightly larger than females. Young birds have the white areas of plumage tinged with grey, a less distinct breast band, and pale fringes to the upperpart and wing covert feathers. The call of the Grey-headed Lapwing is a sharp chee-it.

Behaviour
This species nests from April to July in wet grassland, rice fields and marshland edges. It winters in similar habitat and is then gregarious. It feeds in shallow water on insects, worms and molluscs.

References

Hayman, Marchant and Prater, Shorebirds 
Robson, Craig  A Field Guide to the Birds of Thailand 

Vanellus
Birds of Japan
Birds of Manchuria
Articles containing video clips
Birds described in 1842
Taxa named by Edward Blyth